Hutchinson's patch (or salmon patch of Hutchinson) is a dull orangish-pink area (generally without clear boundaries) on the cornea, most often found at the periphery of the cornea. The sign is an indication of interstitial (or parenchymatous) keratitis, causing corneal neovascularisation.

It is named after the English physician Jonathan Hutchinson (1828–1913).

References

Medical signs
Eye diseases